Club Deportivo Mariano Santos Mateo (sometimes referred as Mariano Santos) is a Peruvian football club, playing in the city of Tingo María, Huánuco, Peru.

History
The Club Deportivo Mariano Santos was founded on April 11, 1987.

In 1993 Copa Perú, the club classified to the Final Stage, but was eliminated when finished in 3rd place.

In 2015 Copa Perú, the club classified to the National Stage, but was eliminated when finished in 46th place.

In 2016 Copa Perú, the club classified to the National Stage, but was eliminated when finished in 38th place.

Honours

Regional
Liga Departamental de Huánuco:
Winners (4): 1991, 1992, 2015, 2016

Liga Provincial de Leoncio Prado:
Winners (1): 2015
Runner-up (1): 2016

Liga Distrital de Rupa Rupa:
Winners (1): 2015

See also
List of football clubs in Peru
Peruvian football league system

References

Football clubs in Peru
Association football clubs established in 1987
1987 establishments in Peru